Nationality words link to articles with information on the nation's poetry or literature (for instance, Irish or France).

Events
 January – The Poetry Review, edited by Harold Monro, supersedes the Poetical Gazette as the journal of the Poetry Society, just renamed from the Poetry Recital Society.
 April 14–15 – Sinking of the RMS Titanic: The ocean liner  strikes an iceberg and sinks on her maiden voyage from the United Kingdom to the United States. This leads to a flood of Titanic poems, including Thomas Hardy's "The Convergence of the Twain".
 September – American poet Robert Frost sails to England.
 Indian poet Rabindranath Tagore takes a sheaf of his translated works to England, where they impress W. B. Yeats, Ezra Pound, Robert Bridges, Ernest Rhys, Thomas Sturge Moore and others. Yeats writes the preface to the English translation of Tagore's Gitanjali
 Harriet Munroe founds Poetry: A Magazine of Verse in Chicago (with Ezra Pound as foreign editor); this year she describes its policy this way:

Imagist poets
 Three poets meet and work out the principles of Imagist poetry. The most prominent of the poets, Ezra Pound, later writes about the formulation in 1954:

 At a meeting with Doolittle and Aldington in the British Museum tea room, Pound appends the signature H.D. Imagiste to Doolittle's poetry, creating a label that was to stick to the poet for most of her writing life
 October – Pound submits to Poetry: A Magazine of Verse three poems each by Doolittle and Aldington under the label Imagiste. Aldington's poems are printed in the November issue, and H.D.'s appear in the January 1913 issue. The March 1913 issue of Poetry also contains Pound's A Few Don'ts by an Imagiste and F. S. Flint's essay Imagisme. This publication history means that Imagism, although London-based, has its first readership in the United States.

Works published in English

Canada
William Henry Drummond, The Poetical Works of William Henry Drummond. New York: G.P. Putnam's Sons. posthumous.
 Pauline Johnson, also known as "Tekahionwake", Flint and Feather, with an introduction by Theodore Watts-Dunton, an English critic
 Seranus, In Northern Skies and Other Poems
 Robert W. Service, Rhymes of a Rolling Stone, Canada

India, in English
 Sarojini Naidu, The Bird of Time, London; Indian poet writing in English, published in the United Kingdom
 Bharati Sarabhai, The Well of the People, Calcutta: Visva-Bharati
 Rabindranath Tagore, Gitanjali, Indian poet writing in English, published in the United Kingdom

United Kingdom
 Robert Bridges, Poetical Works Excluding the Eight Dramas
 Walter de la Mare, The Listeners, and Other Poems
 John Drinkwater, Poems of Love and Earth
 Wilfrid Gibson, Fires
 T. E. Hulme, The Complete Poetical Works, five poems
 Rudyard Kipling, Collected Verse
 Edward Marsh (ed.), Georgian Poetry 1911-12, the first Georgian Poetry anthology
 Claude McKay, Constab Ballads; along with Songs of Jamaica (published in Jamaica), constitute the first published collections of English-language, Creole dialect poetry; Jamaican poet published in the United Kingdom
 Sarojini Naidu, The Bird of Time : Songs of Love, Death and the Spring, Indian poet writing in English, published in Britain
 Ezra Pound, American poet published in the United Kingdom:
Ripostes, London
Translator, The Sonnets and Ballate of Guido Cavalcanti, London
 Isaac Rosenberg, Night and Day
 Dora Sigerson, New Poems
 James Stephens, The Hill of Vision
 Rabindranath Tagore, Gitanjali, Indian poet writing in English, published in Britain

United States
 Florence Earle Coates (1850–1927), The Unconquered Air, and Other Poems
 Robinson Jeffers, Flagons and Apples
 William Ellery Leonard, The Vaunt of Man
 Vachel Lindsay, Rhymes to be Traded for Bread
 Amy Lowell, A Dome of Many-Coloured Glass
 Edna St. Vincent Millay, "Renascence"
 Ezra Pound, American poet published in the United Kingdom:
Ripostes, London
Translator, The Sonnets and Ballate of Guido Cavalcanti, London
 John Hall Wheelock, The Beloved Adventure
 Charles Williams, The Silver Stair
 Elinor Wylie, Incidental Numbers

Other in English
 Adam Lindsay Gordon, The Poems of Adam Lindsay Gordon, Australia
 Claude McKay of Jamaica, publishes the first collections of English-language, Creole dialect poetry:
 Songs of Jamaica, Kingston, Jamaica
 Constab Ballads, London, England

Works published in other languages

France
 Paul Claudel, L'Annonce faite à Marie
 Jean Cocteau, La Danse de Sophocle
 Léon-Paul Fargue, Poemes, suivi de Pour la musique
 Francis Jammes, Les Géorgiques chrétiennes ("Christian Georgics"), three volumes, published from (1911 to this year)
 Pierre Jean Jouve, Présences
 Max Jacob, Les Oeuvres Burlesques et Mystiques de Frère Matorel
 René Maran, La Vie Intérieure, Guyanese writer
 Charles Péguy, Le Porche du mystère de la deuxième vertu
 Saint-John Perse, pen name of Marie-René Alexis Saint-Léger, Eloges
 Victor Segalen, Stèles, an edition of 81 copies (see also Stèles, Peintures, Équipée 1955, and Stelae 1969, a translation into English by Nathaniel Tarn)

Indian subcontinent
Including all of the British colonies that later became India, Pakistan, Bangladesh, Sri Lanka and Nepal. Listed alphabetically by first name, regardless of surname:

Telugu language
 Gurajada Appa Rao (surname: Gurajada), narrative poems written in a four-line, stanzaic form, new for Telugu poetry:
 Kanyaka
 Purnima

Other languages of the Indian subcontinent
 Akshay Kumar Baral, Esa, Indian, Bengali-language
 Maithilisharan Gupta, "Bharat Bharati" ("The Voice of India"), Hindi poem glorifying the nation's past, deploring its contemporary social and political condition and calling for good relations between Hindus and Muslims at a time when animosity between the two groups was rising
 Sumatiben Mehta, Hridayjharnan, a poem conveying her anguish during an extended illness (posthumous), written in the Gujarati language

Other
 Anna Akhmatova, Vecher ("Evening"), her first collection, Russia
 Gottfried Benn, Morgue und andere Gedichte ("Morgue and other Poems") (Berlin), Germany
 David Burliuk, Aleksei Kruchenykh, Vladimir Mayakovsky and Velimir Khlebnikov, A Slap in the Face of Public Taste (Пощёчина общественному вкусу), Russian Futurist anthology
 Takuboku Ishikawa, Kanashiki gangu ("Sad Toys") published posthumously, Japan
 Antonio Machado, Campos de Castilla ("Fields of Castile"), first edition (revised edition 1917); Spain
 Patrick Pearse, Mise Éire ("I am Ireland"), Ireland

Awards and honors

Births
Death years link to the corresponding "[year] in poetry" article:
 January 1 – Nikiforos Vrettakos (died 1991), Greek
 February 11 – Roy Fuller (died 1991), English poet and novelist
 February 27 – Lawrence Durrell (died 1990), Indian-born English novelist, poet, dramatist and travel writer
 May 3 – May Sarton (died 1995), American poet, novelist and memoirist
 May 8 – George Woodcock (died 1995), Canadian poet, biographer, academic and prominent anarchist
 May 25 – Meeraji (died 1949),  Indian, Urdu-language
 June 12 – Roland Robinson (died 1992), Australian
 June 13 – Hector de Saint-Denys Garneau (died 1943), Canadian poet, considered "Quebec's first truly modern poet"
 June 16 – Enoch Powell (died 1998), English MP from 1950 to 1987, classical scholar and poet
 June 29 – John Gawsworth, born Terence Ian Fytton Armstrong (died 1970), English poet and anthologist
 July 14 – Northrop Frye (died 1991), Canadian critic
 July 26 – Niall Sheridan (died 1998), Irish poet, fiction writer and broadcaster
 August 29 – Kenneth Allott (died 1973) Welsh-born Anglo-Irish poet and academic
 September 10 – William Everson, also known as "Brother Antoninus" (died 1994), American poet, author, literary critic and small-press printer
 September 12 – J. F. Hendry (died 1986), Scottish poet later living in Canada
 September 13 – F. T. Prince (died 2003) South African–British poet and academic
 September 16 – John Jefferson Bray (died 1995), Australian
 September 24 – Ian Serraillier (died 1994), English children's writer
 November 5 – Paul Dehn (died 1976), English screenwriter and poet
 November 12 – Donagh MacDonagh (died 1968), Irish poet, playwright and judge
 December 9 – Denis Glover (died 1980), New Zealand poet and publisher
 December 11 – Micky Burn (died 2010), English writer, journalist, World War II commando and prize-winning poet
 Also:
Ali Jafri, Indian,  Urdu-language poet
 P. R. Kaikini, Indian, writing Indian poetry in English
 Nityananda Mahapatra, Indian, Oriya-language novelist, short-story writer, poet and politician
 Prahlad Parekh (died 1962), Indian, Gujarati-language 
 Bharati Sarabhai, Indian English- and Gujarati-language playwright, including verse drama
 Konduru Viraraghavacaryulu, Indian, Telugu-language poet, novelist and scholar

Deaths
Birth years link to the corresponding "[year] in poetry" article:
 January 16 – Georg Heym (born 1887), German poet
 April 13 – Takuboku Ishikawa 石川 啄木 (born 1886), Japanese poet (surname: Ishikawa)
 November 28 – Lorentzos Mavilis (born 1860), Greek
 December 18 – Will Carleton (born 1845), American poet

See also

 Poetry
 List of years in poetry
 Acmeist poetry movement in Russian poetry
 Dymock poets
 Ego-Futurism movement in Russian poetry
 Expressionism movement in German poetry
 Russian Futurism
 Silver Age of Russian Poetry
 Young Poland (Polish: Młoda Polska) modernist period in Polish  arts and literature

Notes

Poetry
20th-century poetry